The fawn-breasted thrush (Zoothera machiki) is a species of bird in the family Turdidae. It is endemic to the Tanimbar Islands in Indonesia. Its natural habitat is subtropical or tropical moist lowland forests. It is threatened by habitat loss.

References

fawn-breasted thrush
Birds of the Tanimbar Islands
fawn-breasted thrush
Taxonomy articles created by Polbot